Wickham, an electoral district of the Legislative Assembly in the Australian state of New South Wales was created in 1894 and abolished in 1920.


Election results

Elections in the 1910s

1917

1913

1910

Elections in the 1900s

1907

1904

1901

Elections in the 1890s

1898

1895

1894

References

New South Wales state electoral results by district